Halewood railway station is in Halewood, Merseyside, England. The station, and all trains serving it, is operated by Northern Trains.

History
Halewood station is modern, having been opened in May 1988, built at a cost of £440,000.

A station, closed in 1952, formerly existing a short distance to the East.

Facilities
There is a ticket office at street level, with inclined ramps leading to the platforms; these both have brick shelters.  It is staffed throughout hours of service (like other Merseytravel stations).

Services

Services are roughly hourly in each direction (including Sundays), towards Hunts Cross and Liverpool Lime Street to the west and towards Hough Green and Manchester Oxford Road in the east.

Gallery

References

External links

Railway stations in the Metropolitan Borough of Knowsley
DfT Category E stations
Former Cheshire Lines Committee stations
Railway stations in Great Britain opened in 1988
Northern franchise railway stations
Railway stations opened by British Rail